North Korea competed as the Democratic People's Republic of Korea at the 2006 Winter Olympics in Turin, Italy.
At the opening ceremony, the athletes of both North and South Korea entered the stadium together behind the Korean Unification Flag.

Figure skating 

Last place after short program, the pairs team of Jong Hyong-hyok and  Phyo Yong-myoung withdrew from free skate after Phyo was injured after crashing into the boards while training.

Key: CD = Compulsory Dance, FD = Free Dance, FS = Free Skate, OD = Original Dance, SP = Short Program

Short track speed skating

References

 

Korea, North
2006
Winter Olympics